O.K. Connery, released in America as Operation Kid Brother, is a 1967 Italian Eurospy comedy film shot in Technicolor and Techniscope and directed by Alberto De Martino. The Spy-Fi plot involves the brother of the British spy James Bond, played by Neil Connery (the actual brother of Sean Connery, star of the Eon Productions Bond films) who is obliged to take the lead in foiling a world-domination plot. The film's cast included several actors from the Eon-produced James Bond film series, From Russia with Loves Daniela Bianchi, Thunderballs Adolfo Celi, Dr. Nos Anthony Dawson, Bernard Lee (M), and Lois Maxwell (Moneypenny), as well as the producer's wife Agata Flori, Gina Lollobrigida's cousin Guido Lollobrigida, and Yasuko Yama (aka Yee-Wah Young and Yee-Wah Yang, then in the publicity spotlight due to her relationship with James Mason; she appeared as a bath girl in You Only Live Twice under the name Yee-Wah Yang<ref>p. 8 "Oh No, Say Mason and the Bond Girl Yama The Straits Times, 18 December 1966</ref>).

The film received generally negative reviews from the New York Times, Variety and the Monthly Film Bulletin with the latter two reviews noting that the film could leave audiences with unintentional laughter at its ineptitude. The film was featured on the film-mocking television series Mystery Science Theater 3000 in 1993.

 Plot 
A luxury yacht, with a crew of beautiful young ladies, arrives in Monte Carlo. At the same time British agent Miss Maxwell (Lois Maxwell)  is at the airfield, awaiting the arrival of Ward Jones, who is bringing an important package for her. Jones lands his light aircraft, which is then destroyed following a collision with a remote controlled but full sized car, operated by the owner of the yacht Thayer (Adolfo Celi). Jones is killed in the explosion, and his package is retrieved by Thayer's henchlady Maya (Daniela Bianchi) .

The search now concentrates on Jones' girlfriend Yashuko, with Maxwell, Maya and Thayer's henchmen in hot pursuit. Yashuko is in the care of Dr Neil Connery (Neil Connery), a cosmetic surgeon who uses hypnotism in his practice, and is attending a medical conference in Monte Carlo. With Connery's help, Yashuka escapes from Thayer's henchmen but is kidnapped by Maxwell instead. Another of Thayer's henchladies Krayendorf (Ana María Noé), disguised as a nun, then infiltrates the hospital where Yashuko is being held, and removes her.

Connery meets Maxwell and her boss Commander Cunningham (Bernard Lee). They explain that Jones had wanted to sell them the package, and that he had asked them to protect Yashuka as she also had access to relevant information. Connery believes that Jones has transferred the data to Yashuka using a form of hypnosis, and Cunningham demands that Connery - an expert in the field - helps them to retrieve the information. Connery refuses, but is reminded that he had killed one of Thayer's henchmen in the fight at the conference. He reluctantly agrees to help, in exchange for the police investigation being dropped.

Thayer and Krayendorf are both part of the THANATOS organisation, led by Alpha (Anthony Dawson) and with Thayer (codename Beta) his second in command. The THANATOS headquarter are in a cave system underneath a shed in the grounds of a Bavarian castle. Alpha explains that the organisation is approaching the climax of Operation Blackmail, intended to extort the world's gold reserves for the benefit of THANATOS, but that they are being delayed by their inability to obtain an "atomic nucleus". The luckless Gamma, responsible for this part of the operation, is killed as a result of his failure.

Beta meets Connery, who is sporting a kilt and tam o'shanter, at a Monte Carlo archery competition where both men display their expertise. Two of Thayer's henchladies, Maya and Mildred (Agata Flori)  flirt with Connery, but Cunningham dispatches him to Malaga where Yashuko has been spotted. Connery and Maxwell are met by Juan (Franco Giacobini), who has left his wedding early to greet them. Mildred has followed them to Malaga, and Connery uses his hypnotic powers to persuade her to reveal Yashuko's true location, Krayendorf's castle.

Connery fires an arrow which shortcircuits the electric fence protecting the castle and destroys its defensive machine gun position. Armed with machine guns, grenades and flamethrowers Connery, Maxwell, Juan and their colleagues attack the castle and defeat Krayendorf's henchmen. Juan kills Krayendorf, and Connery rescues Yashuko. Using his hypnosis, he accesses most of the critical information but Mildred kills Yashuko before the process is complete. Juan then kills Mildred.

Meanwhile, an 'atomic nucleus' is being transported by American military police. Maya and a group of henchladies dress up as can can dancers and lure the MPs from their vehicles, then disable them. Rather that driving off in the truck, they feel it necessary to change into cat costumes and customise the truck into The Wild Pussy Club gambling vehicle before leaving. Now THANATOS have their 'atomic nucleus', they can power their 'ultra hight frequency magnetic waves', which will cause all metal machines to stop working instantly. World leaders will then, according to the plan, give THANATOS their gold.

Following up information revealed by Yashuko, Cunningham persuades Connery to travel to Tétouan, Morocco where Thayer owns a rug factory staffed exclusively by blind men. Some goons try to kill Connery in the street, but he is rescued by Maya. It becomes apparent that Alpha wants Connery dead but, for unclear reasons, Beta wants to keep him alive. Connery attends a party hosted by Beta who is wearing a magnificent golden kaftan. Beta resents Alpha's control of THANATOS, and is plotting to replace him with a double, and Connery is required to change the man's face. Beta is also planning to murder his henchladies, a fact that Connery understands due to his advanced lip-reading skills and passes on to Maya.

Connery infiltrates the rug factory, disguised as a blind Moroccan weaver. He soon discovers that the workers are in contact with dangerous radioactive materials, and warns one of them. The worker immediately instigates a riot and all the workers storm out of the factory. Connery is recognised and captured by Beta, then taken to his yacht where he is to be forced to transform Beta's henchman Kurt (Guido Lollobrigida) into an Alpha lookalike. Before the operation begins, Connery hypnotises Kurt causing him to attack Beta, while the lady crewmembers simultaneously rise up against their male counterparts. The ladies successfully take over the yacht, but Beta escapes in a rubber dinghy.

Alpha blames Beta for his failure and demands that he kill himself. Beta fakes his death, and Alpha is killed instead, allowing Beta to take control of THANATOS. Connery and Maya meet Juan in Munich, where they are also joined by the Scottish members of the Monte Carlo archery club. Beta and his henchmen dress in caramel coloured leather uniforms for the next phase of Operation Blackmail. Meanwhile Connery and Maya search for the secret lair in a helicopter using a Geiger counter to detect the radioactive rugs.

Having located the source of the radiation, Connery and Maya land their helicopter. Connery gains access to the secret THANATOS base through the shed, but sends Maya to get reinforcements - she flies back to the village, notifies Cunningham, and organises the archers to form a rescue party. Meanwhile, Beta instigates the magnetic wave, paralysing machinery all over the world. Guns are no longer operational, so bows and arrows are now optimal weapons. Maya, Juan and the archers ride through the snow to the castle and access the base.

While the archers tackle Beta's henchmen, Connery plants an 'anti magnetic explosive' in order to stop the magnetic wave. He is discovered by Beta and they fight, culminating in an archery duel in which Beta is killed. Connery, Maya and the surviving archers escape from the base, which is then destroyed by a massive explosion. Cunningham wants to recruit Connery as a permanent agent, but Connery uses his hypnotic powers to dissuade him. Maya and Connery depart on Beta's yacht for a romantic cruise.

 Cast 
Neil Connery as Dr. Neil Connery
Daniela Bianchi as Maya Rafis
Adolfo Celi as Mr. Thayer (Beta)
Agata Flori as Mildred
Bernard Lee as Commander Cunningham
Anthony Dawson as Alpha
Lois Maxwell as Miss Maxwell
Yee-Wah Yang (as Yachuo Yama) as Yachuko
Franco Giacobini as Juan
Ana María Noé as Lotte Krayendorf
Guido Lollobrigida as Kurt

 Production 
Neil Connery was working as a plasterer in Scotland until he was sacked for losing his tools.  Based on Neil's relation to his brother Sean, the matter received international media attention.  When Terence Young heard Neil interviewed with his trade union about the matter on the radio he mentioned to Italian producer Dario Sabatello that Neil sounded like his brother Sean.  Sabatello met Neil at the Caledonian Hotel in Edinburgh to recruit him to play the lead role in a Eurospy film.  Neil recalled when he did his screen test the crew kept saying "OK, Connery, OK" that became the title for the film.

Experienced director Alberto De Martino who had previously filmed Upperseven, the Man to Kill and Special Mission Lady Chaplin (both 1966) recalled his father Romolo de Martino doing Neil's extensive makeup and problems with Neil's inexperience as an actor.  He also recalled Sabatello approaching Sean Connery to do an appearance in the film that Connery emphatically refused.

Neil Connery's voice is dubbed by an actor with an American accent. In an interview in Cinema Retro, Neil said that he was undergoing medical treatment when voice dubbing of the film was in progress, leading another person to voice his lines in the English version.

Lois Maxwell recalled she earned more money for the film than her combined award wage payments from all her appearances in the Eon Productions 007 films put together.O.K. Connery was filmed in Tetuán, Morocco, Monaco and Spain.

 Release O.K. Connery was released in Italy in 1967. The film was distributed in the United States by United Artists, the year Sean Connery left the James Bond series, under the title Operation Kid Brother. It was one of six Italian films released worldwide by United Artists in 1967.

On video release the film had alternate titles which included Operation Double 007, Secret Agent 00 and Operation Kid Brother.O.K. Connery was featured on the television series Mystery Science Theater 3000 on September 11, 1993 as "Operation Double 007".

 Reception 
In contemporary reviews, Bosley Crowther writing for The New York Times referred to the film as "a wobbly carbon copy of the James Bond thrillers" Variety described the film as so "unbelievably inept", that "many viewers may find it hilarious fun." The Monthly Film Bulletin stated that O.K. Connery was a "grotesque parody of a parody" noting endless allusions to Neil Connery's brother Sean Connery. The review concluded that "the film as a whole is bad enough to be hysterically funny." The Cleveland Press referred to the film as a "dreary and dismal espionage movie" stating that the film lacked the "flair and skill with which the Bond films are made. The script is labored, the direction slow and the acting is barely adequate."

In Phil Hardy's book Science Fiction (1984), a review noted that "though it's stylishly mounted, the result is a routine Italian spy romp."

In an interview in 1996, Lois Maxwell said that Sean Connery, when he learned that she would join the cast, got very angry and started screaming: "You have betrayed me!" but he later forgave her.

As a "James Bond rip-off", reaction to the film is mixed. Ben Child from The Guardian called it one of the worst movies made for the genre. In contrast, Andy Roberts from The Daily Telegraph and Tom Cole for Radio Times considered it to be one of the best.

 See also 
 Spymaker: The Secret Life of Ian Fleming'' a fictionalised account of Ian Fleming played by Jason Connery
 Bernard Lee on stage and screen
 List of Italian films of 1967
 List of James Bond parodies
 List of Mystery Science Theater 3000 episodes
 Outline of James Bond

References

Footnotes

Sources

External links 
 

1967 films
Italian spy comedy films
English-language Italian films
1960s Italian-language films
Films directed by Alberto De Martino
Films scored by Ennio Morricone
Films shot in Morocco
Films shot in Monaco
Films shot in Spain
Films about hypnosis
Italian parody films
1960s spy comedy films
United Artists films
Titanus films
James Bond
Parody films based on James Bond films
1960s parody films
1967 comedy films
1960s Italian films